The following is a list of winners of the Golden Calf for best Director at the NFF.

 2022 Mascha Halberstad - Knor
 2021 Sabine Lubbe Bakker and Niels van Koevorden - Becoming Mona
 2020 Mischa Kamp - Romy's Salon 
 2019 Sacha Polak - Dirty God 
 2018 Jaap van Heusden - In Blue
 2017 Martin Koolhoven - Brimstone
 2016 Boudewijn Koole - Beyond Sleep
 2015 Remy van Heugten - Gluckauf
 2014 Saskia Diesing - Nena
 2013 Jim Taihuttu - Wolf
 2012 Paula van der Oest - The Domino Effect
 2011 Nanouk Leopold - Brownian Movement
 2010 Rudolf van den Berg - Tirza
 2009 Urszula Antoniak - Nothing Personal
 2008 Joram Lürsen - Alles is Liefde
 2007 Mijke de Jong - Stages (Tussenstand)
 2006 Paul Verhoeven - Black Book (Zwartboek)
 2005 Nanouk Leopold - Guernsey
 2004 Eddy Terstall - Simon
 2003 Pieter Kuijpers - Godforsaken (Van God los)
 2002 Alejandro Agresti - Valentín
 2001 Martin Koolhoven - The Cave (De grot)
 2000 Jean van de Velde - Leak (Lek)
 1999 Roel Reiné - The Delivery
 1998 Karim Traïdia - The Polish Bride (De Poolse bruid)
 1997 Rudolf van den Berg - For My Baby
 1996 Theo van Gogh - Blind Date
 1995 Marleen Gorris - Antonia
 1994 Rosemarie Blank - Crossing Borders (Rit over de grens)
 1993 Ben Sombogaart - The Pocket-knife (Het zakmes)
 1992 Alex van Warmerdam - The Northerners (De noorderlingen)
 1991 Frans Weisz - Bij nader inzien
 1990 Frouke Fokkema - Vigor
 1989 Frans Weisz - Polonaise (Leedvermaak)
 1988 Pieter Verhoeff - Count Your Blessings (Van geluk gesproken)
 1987 Dick Maas - Flodder
 1986 Alex van Warmerdam - Abel
 1985 Paul Verhoeven - Flesh + Blood
 1984 Rudolf van den Berg - Bastille
 1983 Dick Maas - De lift

References

Sources
 Golden Calf Awards (Dutch)
 NFF Website

Best Director
Awards for best director